Nipponocypris koreanus is a species of cyprinid in the genus Nipponocypris, a Cyprinid fish.

References

Cyprinid fish of Asia
Fish of Korea
Taxa named by Ik-Soo Kim
Fish described in 2005